State Route 48 (SR 48) is a  state highway in the eastern part of the U.S. state of Alabama. The western terminus of the highway is at its intersection with SR 9 at Lineville. The highway continues eastward to the Georgia state line, where it continues as Georgia State Route 5 (SR 5).

Route description
SR 48 is routed along two-lane roadways for its entire length. It serves as a feeder route to connect Lineville with U.S. Route 431 (US 431), a major north–south highway in the eastern part of the state. East of the Clay–Randolph county line, the highway crosses over Lake Wedowee. The orientation of the route is generally eastward as it travels from Lineville to Wedowee. At Wedowee, SR 48 intersects US 431 and turns to the northeast, continuing this trajectory as it leads to the Georgia state line.

History
The original routing of SR 48 is quite different from the route that it has today. When the route was formed in 1940, it traveled from Pell City to the Georgia state line east, rather than northeast, of Wedowee. That route has now been replaced by SR 34 from Pell City to Talladega, SR 77 from Talladega to Ashland, and SR 9 from Ashland to Lineville. The old section of SR 48 east of Wedowee is now designated as Randolph County Route 56.

Major intersections

See also

References

048
Transportation in Clay County, Alabama
Transportation in Randolph County, Alabama